On the Spectrum is an Israeli comedy-drama television series created by Dana Idisis and Yuval Shafferman and produced by yes TV and Sumayoko Productions. The series premiered in Israel on May 22, 2018. The show won Best Drama Series in the 2018 Israeli Ophir Awards.

The show won the 2018 Grand Jury Prize in the French Séries Mania festival, making it the second Israeli series to claim the award.
It is the first Israeli show that been accepted into the Tribeca Film Festival and the only non-English show at the festival in 2018.

In 2020, Amazon Studios picked up the series for an English remake adaptation called As We See It, after ordering a pilot in 2019.

In 2021, HBO Max bought the series' rights for North American streaming. The series is available with subtitles and also dubbed with voice actors who are on the spectrum. The series first aired on the platform on April 2 to coincide with Autism Awareness Day.

Plot
The show follows the life of three roommates in their 20s with autism living together in an assisted-living apartment in Ramat Gan.

Productions
Screenwriter Dana Idisis wrote the series inspired by the life story of her autistic brother, who suffers from pervasive developmental disorder and lives with his friends in sheltered housing.

References

External links
 
 On the Spectrum on yes website (in Hebrew)

2018 Israeli television series debuts
Israeli drama television series
Israeli comedy television series
Yes (Israel) original programming
Autism in television
2018 television series endings